Lonomaʻaikanaka was a Queen consort of Hawaii island in ancient Hawaii. She was also High Chiefess of Hilo by birth. She was also considered a Chiefess of Maui.

Family 
Lonomaʻaikanaka was a daughter of High Chief Ahu-a-ʻI, belonging to the powerful and widely spread ʻI family of Hilo, and his wife, Piʻilaniwahine, the daughter of King Kalanikaumakaowākea of Maui.

She married King Keaweʻīkekahialiʻiokamoku and their sons were Kalaninuiamamao and Kekohimoku.

She was married to High Chief Hulu and bore him High Chiefess Kauhiokaka, who also married Keaweʻīkekahialiʻiokamoku and become the mother of Kekaulike-i-Kawekiuonalani, who would marry her half-uncle Kalaninuiamamao.

Through both her son and daughter, she was grandmother and great-grandmother of Keawemauhili. She was also great-grandmother of Chiefess Kapiolani, who accepted Christianity.

References 

House of Keawe
Hawaiian queens consort
Year of birth missing
Year of death missing